The 1971 Grand Prix motorcycle racing season was the 23rd F.I.M. Road Racing World Championship Grand Prix season. The season consisted of twelve Grand Prix races in six classes: 500cc, 350cc, 250cc, 125cc, 50cc and Sidecars 500cc. It began on 9 May, with Austrian Grand Prix and ended with Spanish Grand Prix on 26 September.

Season summary
Giacomo Agostini would claim his tenth world championship in 1971, passing Carlo Ubbiali and Mike Hailwood as the all time championship leader. Angel Nieto challenged for the 50cc and 125cc titles. A crash in the final 50cc race handed the title to Dutchman Jan de Vries but, Nieto was able to claim the 125 crown over a young Barry Sheene. Phil Read captured the 250 championship on a private Yamaha-powered Eric Cheney-designed chassis, after falling out with the Yamaha factory.

Agostini won the 350 title for the fourth year in a row but a newcomer served notice when young Finn, Jarno Saarinen, won his first Grand Prix at the Czechoslovakian round then won again in Italy. Agostini had things his way in the 500cc class, winning  the first eight rounds of the eleven race series against minimal factory-sponsored opposition. For the second consecutive year a New Zealand rider finished second in the premier class – Ginger Molloy in 1970 and Keith Turner in 1971.

Jack Findlay's victory at the 1971 Ulster Grand Prix not only marked the first victory for a Suzuki motorcycle in the premier 500cc class, but also the first-ever 500cc class victory for a motorcycle powered by a two stroke engine. Kawasaki won their first 500cc class victory at the season ending Spanish Grand Prix at Jarama when Dave Simmonds won the race after Agostini sat out the event after already winning the championship. The inaugural Austrian Grand Prix was held at the new high-speed Salzburgring.

1971 Grand Prix season calendar

Scoring system
Points were awarded to the top ten finishers in each race. Only the best of six races were counted on 50cc, 125cc, 350cc and 500cc championships, best of seven in 250cc, while in the Sidecars, the best of five races were counted.

500cc final standings

1971 350 cc Roadracing World Championship final standings

1971 250 cc Roadracing World Championship final standings

1971 125 cc Roadracing World Championship final standings

1971 50 cc Roadracing World Championship final standings

References

 Büla, Maurice & Schertenleib, Jean-Claude (2001). Continental Circus 1949–2000. Chronosports S.A. 

Grand Prix motorcycle racing seasons
Grand Prix motorcycle racing season